The 2011–12 Los Angeles Lakers season was the 64th season of the franchise, its 63rd season in the National Basketball Association (NBA), and its 52nd season in Los Angeles. For the first time since 2005, Phil Jackson did not return as the Lakers coach and replaced by former Cleveland Cavaliers head coach Mike Brown. Following the 2011 NBA lockout each team only played 66 games instead of the usual 82. At midseason they traded longtime point guard Derek Fisher to the Houston Rockets for Jordan Hill and longtime forward Luke Walton to the Cleveland Cavaliers for Ramon Sessions.

The Lakers finished 41–25, roughly the equivalent of 51–31, winning the Pacific Division for the 33rd time. They finished the season as the No. 3 seed in the Western Conference. In the playoffs, they defeated the Denver Nuggets in seven games in the first round, but lost to the eventual Conference champion Oklahoma City Thunder 1–4 in the Western Conference semi-finals. This season marked the final career playoff appearances of Kobe Bryant and Andrew Bynum.

During this season, the Lakers were supposed to acquire Chris Paul from the New Orleans Hornets in a three-team deal that would send Lamar Odom, Goran Dragic, Luis Scola, Kevin Martin, and a 2012 1st round pick to the Hornets and Pau Gasol to the Houston Rockets, but then-NBA Commissioner David Stern vetoed the trade. Following the season, Andrew Bynum was traded to the Philadelphia 76ers in a three-team deal.

Key dates
 June 23: The 2011 NBA Draft took place at Prudential Center in Newark, New Jersey.
 December 19: The Lakers play their first preseason season game against the Los Angeles Clippers.
 December 25: The Lakers play their first regular season game against the Chicago Bulls.
 April 13: The Lakers clinch a playoff berth.
 April 24: The Lakers win the Pacific Division.
 April 26: The Lakers play their final game of the season against the Sacramento Kings.

Draft picks

Roster

Pre-season

|- bgcolor="ffcccc"
| 1
| December 19
| L. A. Clippers
| 
| Kobe Bryant (22)
| Andrew Bynum (12)
| Steve Blake (5)
| Staples Center18,643
| 0–1
|- bgcolor="ffcccc"
| 2
| December 21
| @ L. A. Clippers
| 
| Andrew Bynum (26)
| Andrew Bynum (11)
| Derek Fisher (8)
| Staples Center19,060
| 0–2

Regular season

Emergence of All Star Andrew Bynum
At the start of the season, Andrew Bynum did not play the first four games due to a suspension he earned in the final game of last year's playoff series against the Dallas Mavericks. In his first game back against the Denver Nuggets, he scored 29 points and grabbed 13 rebounds to help the Lakers to a 92-89 win. He had his first 20-20 game on January 3 against the Houston Rockets scoring 21 points and grabbing 22 rebounds. On April 11, 2012 Bynum further showed why he should be an all-star when against the San Antonio Spurs he recorded a career high 30 rebounds and helped the Lakers win the game 98-84. His domination on the glass was further shown when the Spurs only managed to grab 32 rebounds as a team. This was all done with Kobe Bryant, the Lakers best player sitting out. For the first time he was selected to play in the All Star game as the Western Conference's starting center. He was awarded Western Conference Player of the Week for the week of March 12 through 18. Bynum finish the season averaging a career high 18.7 points per game, 11.8 rebounds per game (NBA 3rd overall), and 35.2 minutes per game. His emergence as an all-star and career high numbers sparked a debate of whether Bynum was the best center in the league or Dwight Howard. Previously, Howard was seen widely as the undisputed best center in the league. Shaquille O'Neal was one of the main supporters of Bynum as the best center in the league.

Standings

Record vs. opponents

Trades

Game log

|- bgcolor="#ffcccc"
| 1
| December 25
| Chicago
| 
| Kobe Bryant (28)
| Three Players (8)
| Kobe Bryant (6)
| Staples Center18,997
| 0–1
|- bgcolor="#ffcccc"
| 2
| December 26
| @ Sacramento
| 
| Kobe Bryant (29)
| Pau Gasol (9)
| Kobe Bryant (6)
| Power Balance Pavilion17,317
| 0–2
|- bgcolor="#ccffcc"
| 3
| December 27
| Utah
| 
| Kobe Bryant  (26)
| Troy Murphy (11)
| Kobe Bryant (5)
| Staples Center18,997
| 1–2
|- bgcolor="#ccffcc"
| 4
| December 29
| New York
| 
| Kobe Bryant  (28)
| Pau Gasol (10)
| Kobe Bryant (6)
| Staples Center18,997
| 2–2
|- bgcolor="#ccffcc"
| 5
| December 31
| Denver
| 
| Andrew Bynum (29)
| Andrew Bynum (13)
| Kobe Bryant (9)
| Staples Center18,997
| 3–2

|- bgcolor="#ffcccc"
| 6
| January 1
| @ Denver
| 
| Pau Gasol (20)
| Andrew Bynum (16)
| Three Players(4)
| Pepsi Center19,155
|  3–3
|- bgcolor="#ccffcc"
| 7
| January 3
| Houston
| 
| Kobe Bryant (37)
| Andrew Bynum (22)
| Derek Fisher (7)
| Staples Center18,997
| 4–3
|- bgcolor="#ffcccc"
| 8
| January 5
| @ Portland
| 
| Kobe Bryant (30)
| Andrew Bynum (12)
| Derek Fisher (6)
| Rose Garden20,444
| 4–4
|- bgcolor=#ccffcc
| 9
| January 6
| Golden State
| 
| Kobe Bryant (39)
| Andrew Bynum (16)
| Kobe BryantDerek Fisher (7)
| Staples Center18,997
| 5–4
|- bgcolor="#ccffcc"
| 10
| January 8
| Memphis
| 
| Kobe Bryant (26)
| Andrew BynumPau Gasol (15)
| Kobe Bryant (9)
| Staples Center18,997
| 6–4
|- bgcolor="#ccffcc"
| 11
| January 10
| Phoenix
| 
| Kobe Bryant  (48)
| Pau Gasol (12)
| Steve Blake (8)
| Staples Center18,997
| 7–4
|- bgcolor="#ccffcc"
| 12
| January 11
| @ Utah
| 
| Kobe Bryant (40)
| Pau Gasol (11)
| Derek Fisher (7)
| EnergySolutions Arena 19,642
| 8–4
|- bgcolor="#ccffcc"
| 13
| January 13
| Cleveland
| 
| Kobe Bryant (42)
| Andrew Bynum (11)
| Derek Fisher (10)
| Staples Center 18,997
| 9–4
|- bgcolor="#ffcccc"
| 14
| January 14
| @ L. A. Clippers
| 
| Kobe Bryant (42)
| Andrew Bynum (14)
| Four Players (4)
| Staples Center19,895
| 9–5
|- bgcolor=#ccffcc
| 15
| January 16
| Dallas
| 
| Andrew Bynum (17)
| Andrew Bynum (15)
| Kobe Bryant (7)
| Staples Center18,997
| 10–5
|- bgcolor=#ffcccc
| 16
| January 19
| @ Miami
| 
| Pau Gasol (26)
| Andrew Bynum (12)
| Kobe Bryant (7)
| American Airlines Arena20,004
| 10–6
|- bgcolor=#ffcccc
| 17
| January 20
| @ Orlando
| 
| Kobe Bryant (30)
| Andrew Bynum (12)
| Kobe Bryant (8)
| Amway Center18,846
| 10–7
|- bgcolor=#ffcccc
| 18
| January 22
| Indiana
| 
| Kobe Bryant (33)
| Pau Gasol (8)
| Pau Gasol (10)
| Staples Center18,997
| 10–8
|- bgcolor=#ccffcc
| 19
| January 25
| L. A. Clippers
| 
| Kobe Bryant (24)
| Pau Gasol (10)
| Metta World Peace (7)
| Staples Center18,997
| 11–8
|- bgcolor=#ffcccc
| 20
| January 28
| @ Milwaukee
| 
| Kobe Bryant (27)
| Pau Gasol (15)
| Kobe Bryant (9)
| Bradley Center18,027
| 11–9
|- bgcolor=#ccffcc
| 21
| January 29
| @ Minnesota
| 
| Kobe Bryant (35)
| Kobe Bryant (14)
| Derek Fisher (7)
| Target Center17,551
| 12–9
|- bgcolor=#ccffcc
| 22
| January 31
| Charlotte
| 
| Kobe Bryant (24)
| Andrew Bynum (11)
| Derek Fisher (4)
| Staples Center18,997
| 13–9

|- bgcolor=#ccffcc
| 23
| February 3
| @ Denver
| 
| Andrew Bynum (22)
| Pau Gasol (17)
| Kobe Bryant (9)
| Pepsi Center19,155
| 14–9
|- bgcolor=#ffcccc
| 24
| February 4
| @ Utah
| 
| Kobe Bryant (26)
| Pau Gasol (16)
| Pau Gasol (4)
| EnergySolutions Arena19,642
| 14–10
|- bgcolor=#ffcccc
| 25
| February 6
| @ Philadelphia
| 
| Kobe Bryant (28)
| Andrew Bynum (20)
| Kobe Bryant (6)
| Wells Fargo Center20,064
| 14–11
|- bgcolor=#ccffcc
| 26
| February 9
| @ Boston
| 
| Kobe Bryant (27)
| Andrew Bynum (17)
| Kobe Bryant (4)
| TD Garden18,624
| 15–11
|- bgcolor=#ffcccc
| 27
| February 10
| @ New York
| 
| Kobe Bryant (34)
| Andrew Bynum (13)
| Steve Blake (3)
| Madison Square Garden19,763
| 15–12
|- bgcolor=#ccffcc
| 28
| February 12
| @ Toronto
| 
| Kobe Bryant (27)
| Pau Gasol (17)
| Pau Gasol (6)
| Air Canada Centre19,311
| 16–12
|- bgcolor=#ccffcc
| 29
| February 14
| Atlanta
| 
| Pau Gasol (20)
| Andrew Bynum (15)
| Steve Blake (6)
| Staples Center18,997
| 17–12
|- bgcolor=#ccffcc
| 30
| February 17
| Phoenix
| 
| Kobe Bryant (36)
| Andrew Bynum (14)
| Kobe Bryant (6)
| Staples Center18,997
| 18–12
|- bgcolor=#ffcccc
| 31
| February 19
| @ Phoenix
| 
| Kobe Bryant (32)
| Pau Gasol (12)
| Pau Gasol (6)
| US Airways Center18,023
| 18–13
|- bgcolor=#ccffcc
| 32
| February 20
| Portland
| 
| Kobe Bryant (29)
| Andrew Bynum (19)
| Pau Gasol (4)
| Staples Center18,997
| 19–13
|- bgcolor=#ccffcc
| 33
| February 22
| @ Dallas
| 
| Pau Gasol (24)
| Andrew Bynum (14)
| Steve Blake (5)
| American Airlines Center20,577
| 20–13
|- bgcolor=#ffcccc
| 34
| February 23
| @ Oklahoma City
| 
| Kobe Bryant (24)
| Serge Ibaka (13)
| Metta World Peace (5)
| Chesapeake Energy Arena18,203
| 20–14
|- align="center"
|colspan="9" bgcolor="#bbcaff"|All-Star Break
|- bgcolor=#ccffcc
| 35
| February 29
| Minnesota
| 
| Kobe Bryant (31)
| Andrew Bynum (13)
| Kobe Bryant (8)
| Staples Center
| 21–14

|- bgcolor=#ccffcc
| 36
| March 2
| Sacramento
| 
| Kobe Bryant (38)
| Andrew Bynum (15)
| Derek Fisher (7)
| Staples Center18,997
| 22–14
|- bgcolor=#ccffcc
| 37
| March 4
| Miami
| 
| Kobe Bryant (33)
| Andrew Bynum (13)
| Steve Blake (6)
| Staples Center18,997
| 23–14
|- bgcolor=#ffcccc
| 38
| March 6
| @ Detroit
| 
| Andrew Bynum (30)
| Andrew Bynum (14)
| Kobe Bryant (7)
| The Palace of Auburn Hills22,076
| 23–15
|- bgcolor=#ffcccc
| 39
| March 7
| @ Washington
| 
| Kobe Bryant (30)
| Pau Gasol (15)
| Steve Blake (7)
| Verizon Center20,282
| 23–16
|- bgcolor=#ccffcc
| 40
| March 9
| @ Minnesota
| 
| Kobe Bryant (34)
| Pau Gasol (11)
| Steve Blake (5)
| Target Center20,164
| 24–16
|- bgcolor=#ccffcc
| 41
| March 11
| Boston
| 
| Kobe Bryant (26)
| Andrew Bynum (14)
| Kobe Bryant (7)
| Staples Center18,997
| 25–16
|- bgcolor=#ccffcc
| 42
| March 13
| @ Memphis
| 
| Andrew Bynum (37)
| Andrew Bynum (16)
| Pau Gasol (8)
| FedExForum18,119
| 26–16
|- bgcolor=#ccffcc
| 43
| March 14
| @ New Orleans
| 
| Kobe Bryant (33)
| Andrew Bynum (18)
| Kobe Bryant (5)
| New Orleans Arena17,272
| 27–16
|- bgcolor=#ccffcc
| 44
| March 16
| Minnesota
| 
| Kobe Bryant (28)
| Andrew Bynum (14)
| Steve Blake (6)
| Staples Center18,997
| 28–16
|- bgcolor=#ffcccc
| 45
| March 18
| Utah
| 
| Andrew Bynum (33)
| Andrew Bynum (11)
| Matt BarnesRamon Sessions (6)
| Staples Center18,997
| 28–17
|- bgcolor=#ffcccc
| 46
| March 20
| @ Houston
| 
| Kobe Bryant (29)
| Andrew Bynum (7)
| Three players (4)
| Toyota Center18,391
| 28–18
|- bgcolor=#ccffcc
| 47
| March 21
| @ Dallas
| 
| Kobe Bryant (30)
| Matt BarnesPau Gasol (9)
| Ramon Sessions (9)
| American Airlines Center20,664
| 29–18
|- bgcolor=#ccffcc
| 48
| March 23
| Portland
| 
| Andrew Bynum (28)
| Pau Gasol (16)
| Ramon Sessions (11)
| Staples Center18,997
| 30–18
|- bgcolor=#ffcccc
| 49
| March 25
| Memphis
| 
| Andrew Bynum (30)
| Pau Gasol (14)
| Ramon Sessions (5)
| Staples Center18,997
| 30–19
|- bgcolor=#ccffcc
| 50
| March 27
| @ Golden State
| 
| Kobe Bryant (30)
| Pau Gasol (17)
| Kobe Bryant (5)
| Oracle Arena19,596
| 31–19
|- bgcolor=#ffcccc
| 51
| March 29
| Oklahoma City
| 
| Andrew Bynum (25)
| Andrew Bynum (13)
| Ramon Sessions (5)
| Staples Center18,997
| 31–20
|- bgcolor=#ccffcc
| 52
| March 31
| New Orleans
| 
| Pau Gasol (21)
| Pau Gasol (11)
| Ramon Sessions (10)
| Staples Center18,997
| 32–20

|- bgcolor=#ccffcc
| 53
| April 1
| Golden State
| 
| Kobe Bryant (40)
| Pau Gasol (11)
| Ramon Sessions (9)
| Staples Center18,897
| 33–20
|- bgcolor=#ccffcc
| 54
| April 3
| New Jersey
| 
| Kobe Bryant (24)
| Pau Gasol (12)
| Ramon Sessions (11)
| Staples Center18,997
| 34–20
|- bgcolor=#ccffcc
| 55
| April 4
| @ L. A. Clippers
| 
| Andrew Bynum (36)
| Andrew Bynum (8)
| Ramon Sessions (8)
| Staples Center19,819
| 35–20
|- bgcolor=#ffcccc
| 56
| April 6
| Houston
| 
| Kobe Bryant (28)
| Matt Barnes (13)
| Ramon Sessions (7)
| Staples Center18,997
| 35–21
|- bgcolor=#ffcccc
| 57
| April 7
| @ Phoenix
| 
| Pau Gasol (30)
| Andrew Bynum (18)
| Ramon Sessions (9)
| US Airways Center18,237
| 35–22
|- bgcolor=#ccffcc
| 58
| April 9
| @ New Orleans
| 
| Pau Gasol (25)
| Andrew Bynum (11)
| Ramon Sessions (6)
| New Orleans Arena17,275
| 36–22
|- bgcolor=#ccffcc
| 59
| April 11
| @ San Antonio
| 
| Metta World Peace (26)
| Andrew Bynum (30)
| Ramon Sessions (5)
| AT&T Center18,581
| 37–22
|- bgcolor=#ccffcc
| 60
| April 13
| Denver
| 
| Andrew Bynum (30)
| Matt BarnesPau Gasol (10)
| Ramon Sessions (6)
| Staples Center18,997
| 38–22
|- bgcolor=#ccffcc
| 61
| April 15
| Dallas
| 
| Andrew Bynum (23)
| Andrew Bynum (16)
| Matt Barnes (8)
| Staples Center18,997
| 39–22
|- bgcolor="#ffcccc"
| 62
| April 17
| San Antonio
| 
| Andrew Bynum (21)
| Pau Gasol (7)
| Steve Blake (7)
| Staples Center18,997
| 39–23
|- bgcolor="#ccffcc"
| 63
| April 18
| @ Golden State
| 
| Andrew Bynum (31)
| Pau Gasol (11)
| Pau Gasol (11)
| Oracle Arena
| 40–23
|- bgcolor="#ffcccc"
| 64
| April 20
| @ San Antonio
| 
| Kobe Bryant (18)
| Pau Gasol (8)
| Steve Blake (5)
| AT&T Center18,547
| 40–24
|- bgcolor="#ccffcc"
| 65
| April 22
| Oklahoma City
| 
| Kobe Bryant (26)
| Jordan Hill (15)
| Pau Gasol (9)
| Staples Center18,997
| 41–24
|- bgcolor="#ffcccc"
| 66
| April 26
| @ Sacramento
| 
| Josh McRoberts (16)
| Josh McRoberts (9)
| Steve Blake (6)
| Power Balance Pavilion16281
| 41–25

Playoffs

Denver Nuggets
The Lakers were matched against the Denver Nuggets in the first round of the 2012 NBA Playoffs.  They won the opening game 103–88 after Andrew Bynum had a triple-double with 10 points, 13 rebounds, and 10 blocked shots. The blocked shots broke Kareem Abdul-Jabbar's franchise record of nine, and tied the NBA playoff record set by Mark Eaton and Hakeem Olajuwon. Kobe Bryant scored 31 points and Pau Gasol added 13 points, eight rebounds and eight assists. After the Lakers led the series 3–1, Bynum before Game 5 said, "Close-out games are actually kind of easy." The Lakers won the series 4–3, and avoided becoming the ninth team in NBA history to blow a 3-1 lead in a series. Gasol had 23 points, 17 rebounds and six assists, Bynum had 16 points and a career playoff-high 18 rebounds, and Steve Blake scored a playoff career-high 19 points in a 96–87 win in Game 7. The Lakers blew 16-point lead in the second half before Gasol put the Lakers ahead for good with a tip-in basket with 6:30 to play. Denver had 19 turnovers in the game and shot just 7-of-27 shooting in the fourth quarter. Returning from his seven-game suspension, Metta World Peace scored 15 points, while Bryant had 17 points added eight assists.

Oklahoma City Thunder
The Lakers were then matched up against the second seeded Oklahoma City Thunder in the second round of the 2012 NBA Playoffs. During this series the Lakers did not have home court advantage as they did against Denver. In the first game of the series the Thunder blew the Lakers out 90-119. In the second game, the Lakers led 75-68 with 2:08 to play but were unable to hold on. Kevin Durant hit the go ahead bucket with 18.6 seconds to go and Steve Blake missed a three-pointer in the corner resulting in a 75-76 Laker loss. The Lakers won game 3 at home 99-96. Kobe Bryant scored 36 points going 18-18 from the free throw line including the last 2 free throws that put the Lakers up by 3. Game 4 ended with a 100-103 Thunder win. The Lakers held a 9-point lead with 6:01 to play in the 4th quarter but were unable to sustain. This time it was Kevin Durant with the go-ahead three-pointer over Metta World Peace. Kobe Bryant had 38 points to lead the Lakers but Russell Westbrook and Kevin Durant were able to both match him combining for 68 points. Ultimately, the eventual Western Conference Champions Thunder proved too much for the Lakers, winning the next game at Chesapeake Energy Arena 90-106, wrapping up the series 1-4. Kobe Bryant averaged 31.2 points per game in the series. Andrew Bynum, the Lakers other All-Star did not perform up to his usual standards and only averaged 16.6 points per game and 9.4 rebounds per game. This was low considering during the regular season he averaged 18.7 points and 11.8 rebounds per game, both career highs. This marked the second year in a row the Lakers were defeated in the second round of the playoffs. The previous year they were swept 4-0 by the Dallas Mavericks.

|- bgcolor=ccffcc
| 1
| April 29
| Denver
| 
| Kobe Bryant (31)
| Andrew Bynum (13)
| Pau Gasol (8)
| Staples Center18,997
| 1–0
|- bgcolor=ccffcc
| 2
| May 1
| Denver
| 
| Kobe Bryant (38)
| 2 Players Tied (10)
| Pau Gasol (5)
| Staples Center18,997
| 2–0
|- bgcolor=ffcccc
| 3
| May 4
| @ Denver
| 
| Kobe Bryant (22)
| Andrew Bynum (12)
| 2 Players Tied (6)
| Pepsi Center19,155
| 2–1
|- bgcolor=ccffcc
| 4
| May 6
| @ Denver
| 
| Kobe Bryant (22)
| Jordan Hill (11)
| 2 Players Tied (6)
| Pepsi Center19,155
| 3–1
|- bgcolor=ffcccc
| 5
| May 8
| Denver
| 
| Kobe Bryant (43)
| Andrew Bynum (11)
| Ramon Sessions (4)
| Staples Center18,997
| 3–2
|- bgcolor=ffcccc
| 6
| May 10
| @ Denver
| 
| Kobe Bryant (31)
| Andrew Bynum (16)
| 2 Players Tied (4)
| Pepsi Center19,770
| 3–3
|- bgcolor=ccffcc
| 7
| May 12
| Denver
| 
| Pau Gasol (23)
| Andrew Bynum (18)
| Kobe Bryant (8)
| Staples Center18,997
| 4–3

|- bgcolor=ffcccc
| 1
| May 14
| @ Oklahoma City
| 
| Kobe Bryant, Andrew Bynum (20)
| Andrew Bynum (14)
| Steve Blake (4)
| Chesapeake Energy Arena18,203
| 0–1
|- bgcolor=ffcccc
| 2
| May 16
| @ Oklahoma City
| 
| Kobe Bryant, Andrew Bynum (20)
| Pau Gasol (11)
| Kobe Bryant (4)
| Chesapeake Energy Arena18,203
| 0–2
|- bgcolor=ccffcc
| 3
| May 18
| Oklahoma City
| 
| Kobe Bryant (36)
| Pau Gasol, Andrew Bynum (11)
| Kobe Bryant, Pau Gasol (6)
| Staples Center18,997
| 1–2
|- bgcolor=ffcccc
| 4
| May 19
| Oklahoma City
| 
| Kobe Bryant (38)
| Andrew Bynum (9)
| Kobe Bryant, Ramon Sessions (5)
| Staples Center18,997
| 1–3
|- bgcolor=ffcccc
| 5
| May 21
| @ Oklahoma City
| 
| Kobe Bryant (42)
| Pau Gasol (16)
| Meta World Peace (5)
| Chesapeake Energy Arena18,203
| 1–4

Player statistics

Regular season

Playoffs

Awards, records and milestones

Awards
 Pau Gasol won the J. Walter Kennedy Citizenship Award.

Week/month
The following players were named the Western Conference Players of the Week.

The following players were named Western Conference Players of the Month.

All-Star
 Kobe Bryant was voted as an All-Star starter for the 14th consecutive time.
 Andrew Bynum was voted as an All-Star starter for the 1st time.

Records
 January 1: Kobe Bryant became the youngest player to score 28,000 career points at 33 years and 131 days old.
 March 27: Kobe Bryant passed Michael Jordan for second most points scored by a player for a single franchise after scoring 30 points against the Golden State Warriors.
 Andrew Bynum recorded 10 blocks against the Denver Nuggets in Game 1 of the NBA Division playoffs tying an NBA playoff record set by Mark Eaton and Hakeem Olajuwon.

Team records
 January 28: Kobe Bryant made his 7,161st free throw against the Milwaukee Bucks, breaking the Lakers all-time free throw record set by Jerry West.
 January 29: Kobe Bryant made his 9,936th field goal against the Minnesota Timberwolves breaking the Lakers all-time record set by Kareem Abdul-Jabbar.
 February 6: Kobe Bryant passed Shaquille O'Neal into 5th place on the all-time scoring list against the Philadelphia 76ers.
 February 10: Kobe Bryant made his 10,000th career field goal in a game against the New York Knicks.
 March 9: Kobe Bryant, at 33 years and 200 days old, became the youngest player to score 29,000 points in a game against the Minnesota Timberwolves.

Milestones
 January 20: Los Angeles Lakers power forward Pau Gasol scored his 14,000th career point in a game against the Orlando Magic.

Team milestones

Transactions

Free agents

Additions
Power Forwards Troy Murphy, Josh McRoberts, and Guard/Forward Jason Kapono, who was later traded to the Cleveland Cavaliers.

Subtractions
Derrick Caracter

Pre-season trades
In December 2011, NBA commissioner David Stern vetoed a proposed three-team trade that would have sent Chris Paul to the Lakers, Lamar Odom to the New Orleans Hornets, and Pau Gasol to the Houston Rockets. Stern said the Hornets were better off keeping Paul than accepting the terms of the deal. The league had acquired the Hornets from former owner George Shinn, and the commissioner's office had final authority over all management decisions. Odom felt "disrespected" after he learned of the Hornets trade publicly, and he requested a trade from the Lakers to another contending team. The Lakers were also concerned that Odom's contract was pricey since he was not needed to initiate the triangle offense with Mike Brown replacing Phil Jackson as Lakers coach. Odom was traded to the Dallas Mavericks for a first-round draft pick and an $8.9 million trade exception on December 11.

Mid-season trades
On March 15, 2012, the Lakers traded Luke Walton, Jason Kapono, and a 2012 first-round draft pick to the Cleveland Cavaliers for Ramon Sessions, Christian Eyenga, and the right to swap a 2013 first-round pick for Miami's, currently owned by Cleveland. They also traded longtime Laker and co-captain Derrick Fisher and a 2012 first-round draft pick to the Houston Rockets for Jordan Hill. These trades gave them the younger, quicker starting point guard they had been looking for to compete in a league that featured quick, explosive point guards on almost every team. Hill bolstered the Laker frontline which featured oft-injured Andrew Bynum. Both Sessions and Hill added youth to a Laker team filled with old veterans. Although Hill did not play immediately, he later planted himself as a key bench player after his breakout game against the Oklahoma City Thunder. After Metta World Peace was ejected for elbowing James Harden, the shorthanded Lakers called upon Hill. In his first game with significant minutes for the Lakers, he scored 14 points, grabbed 15 rebounds, and blocked 3 shots. Not only did he play an important role in both overtime periods, he was so productive that Coach Mike Brown played Hill instead of Bynum, the Lakers' all star center. Hill helped the Lakers defeat the Thunder, 114–106.

References

Los Angeles Lakers seasons
Los Angeles Lakers
Los Angle
Los Angle